Lee Chang-hoon (born September 8, 1966) is a South Korean actor. Lee is a comedian turned actor. He was cast in the lead in Korean dramas Daring Women (2010) and While You Were Sleeping (2011) .

Filmography

Film

Television series

Variety show

Awards and nominations

References

External links 
 Lee Chang-hoon at CJ Entertainment 
 
 
 

1966 births
Living people
20th-century South Korean male actors
21st-century South Korean male actors
South Korean male television actors
South Korean male film actors